Joaquim Silva e Luna (born December 10, 1949 in Barreiros, Pernambuco), is a Brazilian politician and former Brazilian Army general who served as Minister of Defence from February 2018 until January 2019.

Biography

He began his military career on February 10, 1969, in the Academia Militar das Agulhas Negras. He graduates lieutenant of Engineering on December 16, 1972.

He was promoted to 1st lieutenant on August 31, 1975 and to captain on August 31, 1978. In this period, he realized the specialization courses of Communications (1976) and  Jungle Expert (1979). He also made the advanced course of Engineering in 1981. He worked many years in the construction Battalions of the Army.

Promoted to major in August, 1985, he studied in the Escola de Comando e Estado-Maior do Exército (Brazil) in 1987 and 1988. Later, was promoted to lieutenant colonel on April 30, 1990 and was Engineering advisor in Paraguay, between 1992 and 1994.

Colonel on April 30, 1995, he commanded the 6th Construction Engineering Battalion in Boa Vista, Roraima, between 1996 and 1998. Later, he returned to the Escola de Comando e Estado-Maior do Exército (Brazil) to realize the Political and Strategic Course. He was military attaché in Israel from 1999 to 2001.

He was promoted to major general on March 31, 2002, and designated to command the 16th Jungle Infantry Brigade, located in Tefé - Amazonas, between 2002 and 2004. Later he was the director of Patrimony of the Army, being promoted to lieutenant general on March 31, 2006.

He was the Chief of Cabinet from the Brazilian Army Commander, General Enzo Martins Peri, from 2007 to March 31, 2011, when was promoted to four-star general. Between May 10, 2011, and April 10, 2014, he was Brazilian Army Chief of Staff.

After his retirement from active duty, he was nominated as Personnel, Education, Health and Sports Secretary of the Ministry of Defence (Brazil). On October 26, he became Secretary-General of the Ministry.

He was the first military man designated as Minister of Defence since its creation in 1999, and the 11th person to assume that function.

In February 2021, President Jair Bolsonaro fired Roberto Castello Branco and appointed Silva e Luna as the next President of the Brazilian state oil company Petrobras.

Dates of rank

Recognitions and honors
{| style="width:100%;"
|-
|valign="top" |

References

|-

|-

|-

1949 births
Living people
Brazilian generals
Defence ministers of Brazil